The Chilean eagle ray (Myliobatis chilensis) is a species of fish in the family Myliobatidae. Found off the coasts of Chile and Peru, its natural habitat is open sea.

References

Myliobatis
Taxonomy articles created by Polbot
Fish described in 1892